Melanapamea is a genus of moths of the family Noctuidae.

Species
 Melanapamea mixta (Grote, 1881)

Hadeninae